The American Academy of Emergency Medicine (AAEM) is a nonprofit professional medical association of emergency medicine physicians. It was formed in 1993 is based out of Milwaukee, Wisconsin.

AAEM works cooperatively alongside the American College of Emergency Physicians and the American College of Osteopathic Emergency Physicians when the interests of emergency medicine call for a united front. Active membership is open to all physicians who have completed an emergency medicine residency approved by either the Accreditation Council for Graduate Medical Education or American Osteopathic Association. The association is also affiliated with the American Academy of Emergency Medicine/Resident and Student Association.

Fellows use the post-nominal letters FAAEM.

References

External links
Official website: American Academy of Emergency Medicine

Medical associations based in the United States
Emergency medicine organisations
Medical and health organizations based in Wisconsin